The 2001 Formula Renault 2000 Eurocup season was the eleventh Eurocup Formula Renault 2.0 season. The season began at Autodromo Nazionale Monza on 30 March and finished at the Autódromo do Estoril on 4 November, after ten races. RC Motorsport driver Augusto Farfus claimed the championship title, taking four victories at Monza, Brno, Magny-Cours and Hungaroring. Marc Benz won one race at Nürburgring. César Campaniço who missed Zolder and Spielberg rounds finished season on third place. Fourth-placed Ryan Briscoe scored two wins at the end of the season on Iberian circuits Jarama and Estoril. Other wins were scored by Bruno Spengler, Ronnie Quintarelli and Eric Salignon.

Teams and drivers

Calendar

Championship standings

Drivers
Points are awarded to the drivers as follows:

Teams

References

Eurocup
Eurocup Formula Renault
Renault Eurocup